Songs from Call Me Claus is a reissue of Garth Brooks and the Magic of Christmas, the second Christmas album by American country music artist Garth Brooks, and was released on September 25, 2001.  The songs exclusive to this release are "Call Me Claus," "Mary Had a Little Lamb," and "'Zat You, Santa Claus?".

Track listing
"Call Me Claus" (Garth Brooks, Lisa Sanderson, Jenny Yates) – 2:08
"It's the Most Wonderful Time of the Year" (Edward Pola, George Wyle) – 2:57
"Have Yourself a Merry Little Christmas" (Ralph Blane, Hugh Martin) – 4:05
"Let It Snow! Let It Snow! Let It Snow!" (Sammy Cahn, Jule Styne) – 2:07
"Winter Wonderland" (Felix Bernard, Dick Smith) – 3:34
"Mary Had a Little Lamb" (Larry Bastian, Gordon Kennedy, Wayne Kirkpatrick) – 3:00
"The Christmas Song" (Mel Tormé, Robert Wells) – 3:25
"Baby Jesus Is Born" (Randy Handley, Cam King) – 3:59
"Sleigh Ride" (Leroy Anderson, Mitchell Parish) – 3:27
"Silver Bells" (Ray Evans, Jay Livingston) – 3:35
"(There's No Place Like) Home For The Holidays" (Robert Allen, Al Stillman) – 2:19
"'Zat You, Santa Claus?" (Jack Fox) – 2:33
"The Wise Man's Journey" [instrumental] (Bobby Wood) – 1:28
"O Little Town of Bethlehem" (Phillips Brooks, Lewis H. Redner) – 3:00

Chart performance
Songs from Call Me Claus peaked at 99 on the U.S. Billboard 200, and peaked at #8 on Top Country Albums.

Charts

Singles

Personnel
Garth Brooks - lead vocals 
Mark Casstevens - acoustic guitar
Chris Leuzinger - electric guitar
The Nashville String Machine - strings
Jeff Bailey, Ernie Collins, Mark Douthit, Chris Dunn, Robert Green, Michael Haynes, Don *Jackson, Sam Levine, Chris McDonald, Douglas Moffet, Steve Patrick, Denis Solee, George Tidwell - horns
Blair Masters - Hammond B-3 organ
Bobby Wood - keyboards
Mike Chapman - bass guitar
Milton Sledge - drums
Sam Bacco - percussion

References and external links

Garth Brooks albums
2001 Christmas albums
Christmas albums by American artists
Albums produced by Allen Reynolds
Capitol Records Christmas albums
Reissue albums
Country Christmas albums